Beat The Drum – Celebrating 40 Years of Triple J was a live concerts and subsequent compilation album and DVD of the concert. The concert was a celebration of forty years of Triple J.

The concert was held in The Domain, Sydney, on Friday the 16 of January 2015. Acts performing included Daniel Johns, Gotye, Sarah Blasko, Paul Dempsey, The Cat Empire, Owl Eyes, The Preatures, Bernard Fanning, Vance Joy, Tom Iansek, The Presets, The Hilltop Hoods, You Am I, Joelistics and Adalita. The concert was broadcast live on Triple J.

A triple CD and a DVD of tracks from the concert were released in May 2015. The CD version won an ARIA Award for Best Original Soundtrack/Cast/Show Album.

Reception
George Palathingal of the Sydney Morning Herald commented that "Some bands' sets tended towards the pedestrian when playing their own material but each featured a sparkling cover, a guest spot or two, a classic of their own or combinations thereof." The Conversations Liz Giuffre wrote that "Most of the performers mixed their own music with covers. The pattern made a great novelty for trainspotters in the crowd, but also rewarded long-time listeners with fun trips back through the songbook." Sunshine Coast Daily wrote that "Last week’s Beat The Drum Festival in Sydney’s Domain to celebrate 40 years of Triple J on our airwaves was nothing short of spectacular." 

The CD release peaked at #10 on ARIA's Album Chart. and the DVD reached #2 on ARIA's Top 40 Audiovisual chart. Kate Tala wrote in the Newcastle Herald that the CD and DVD were "jam-packed with an incredible string of guest appearances and unforgettable covers."

Accolades

Album track listing

 Surrender - Ball Park Music
 Everything Is Sh!t Except My Friendship With You - Ball Park Music
 Trippin' The Light Fantastic - Ball Park Music
 Like Wow-Wipeout - Ball Park Music (feat Dave Faulkner)
 She Only Loves Me When I'm There - Ball Park Music
 Wasted Time - Vance Joy
 Reckless - Vance Joy feat Bernard Fanning and Tom Iansek
 Play With Fire - Vance Joy
 Riptide - Vance Joy
 Mess Is Mine - Vance Joy
 Hearts A Mess - Gotye
 Thanks For Your Time - Gotye
 It Gets Better (aka Better Than It Ever Could Be) - The Preatures
 Ordinary - The Preatures
 Cruel - The Preatures
 Boys In Town - The Preatures feat Mark McEntee
 Is This How You Feel? - The Preatures
 Explain - Sarah Blasko
 Distant Sun - Sarah Blasko and Paul Dempsey

 The Hunt - Briggs (with Trials)
 Rumble - You Am I
 Say I'm Good - You Am I feat Joelistics
 Jewels and Bullets - You Am I feat Adalita
 Cathy's Clown - You Am I
 Berlin Chair - You Am I
 Smells Like Teen Spirit - Daniel Johns
 Brighter Than Gold - The Cat Empire
 Prophets In The Sky - The Cat Empire
 Two Shoes - The Cat Empire
 Saggin - The Cat Empire feat Remi
 In My Pocket - The Cat Empire
 Confide In Me - The Cat Empire feat Owl Eyes
 Steal The Light - The Cat Empire
 The Chariot / Hotel California - The Cat Empire
 Switch Lanes - Tkay Maidza
 U-Huh - Tkay Maidza

 Fall - The Presets
 Ghosts - The Presets feat Hermitude
 This Boy's In Love - The Presets feat Megan Washington
 Youth In Trouble - The Presets
 My People - The Presets
 Are You The One? - The Presets feat DZ Deathrays
 Talk Like That - The Presets
 Chase That Feeling - Hilltop Hoods
 I Love It - Hilltop Hoods
 Still Standing - Hilltop Hoods
 Won't Let You Down - Hilltop Hoods
 The Hard Road - Hilltop Hoods
 Rattling The Keys To The Kingdom - Hilltop Hoods
 Cosby Sweater - Hilltop Hoods feat Illy, Horrorshow, Drapht, Seth Sentry, Tkay Maidza and Thundamentals
 The Nosebleed Section - Hilltop Hoods

DVD track listing

 Surrender - Ball Park Music
 Everything Is Sh!t Except My Friendship With You - Ball Park Music
 Like Wow-Wipeout - Ball Park Music Feat Dave Faulkner
 She Only Loves Me When I’m There - Ball Park Music
 Bad Apples - Briggs (With Trials)
 Wasted Time - Vance Joy
 Reckless - Vance Joy feat Bernard Fanning and Tom Iansek
 Riptide - Vance Joy
 Mess Is Mine - Vance Joy
 Hearts A Mess - Gotye
 Thanks For Your Time - Gotye
 It Gets Better (aka Better Than It Could Ever Be) - The Preatures
 Ordinary - The Preatures
 Boys In Town - The Preatures feat Mark McEntee
 Is This How You Feel? - The Preatures
 Explain - Sarah Blasko
 Distant Sun - Sarah Blasko and Paul Dempsey
 Rumble - You Am I
 Say I’m Good - You Am I feat Joelistics
 Jewels And Bullets - You Am I feat Adalita
 Cathy’s Clown - You Am I
 Berlin Chair - You Am I
 Smells Like Teen Spirit - Daniel Johns
 Brighter Than Gold - The Cat Empire
 Two Shoes - the CAt Empire
 Saggin - The Cat Empire feat Remi
 In My Pocket - The Cat Empire
 Confide In Me - The Cat Empire feat Owl Eyes
 The Chariot / Hotel California - The Cat Empire
 U-Huh - Tkau Maidza
 Ghosts - The Presets feat Hermitude
 This Boy’s In Love - The Presets feat Megan Washington
 Youth In Trouble - The Presets
 My People - The Presets
 Are You The One - The Presets feat DZ Deathrays
 Talk Like That - The Presets
 Chase That Feeling - Hilltop Hoods
 I Love It - Hilltop Hoods
 Won’t Let You Down - Hilltop Hoods
 The Hard Road - Hilltop Hoods
 Rattling The Keys To The Kingdom - Hilltop Hoods
 Cosby Sweater - Hilltop Hoods feat Horroshow, Drapht, Seth Sentry, Tkay Maidza and Thundamentals
 The Nosebleed Section - Hilltop Hoods

References

Compilation albums by Australian artists
2015 compilation albums